WOTX (93.7 FM) is a radio station licensed to serve Lunenburg, Vermont.  The station is owned by Alexxon Corp.  The station signed on the air on May 5, 2008 with a classic hits & classic rock hybrid format branded as "The Outlaw".

The station has been assigned these call letters by the Federal Communications Commission since September 11, 2007.

Translators
In addition to the main station, WOTX is relayed by additional translators.

References

External links

Radio-Info

OTX
Classic rock radio stations in the United States
Radio stations established in 2008
2008 establishments in Vermont